Sanawan railway station is located in town of Sanawan in Kot Addu District of Punjab, Pakistan.

See also
 List of railway stations in Pakistan
 Pakistan Railways

References

External links

Kot Addu District
Railway stations on Sher Shah–Kot Addu Branch Line